Milton James Ferguson (April 11, 1879 – October 23, 1954) was an American librarian.  He graduated from the University of Oklahoma in 1906, and served as librarian of the University of Oklahoma from 1902 to 1907. He helped organize and was elected the first president of the Oklahoma Library Association (1907–08). He later became California State Librarian (1917–1930). In 1926 Ferguson was an honorary member of the California Society of Printmakers (né Etchers). He worked for the Carnegie Corporation making library surveys in Africa, and was librarian of the Brooklyn Public Library until 1949.  In 1938–39, Ferguson was president of the American Library Association.

References

External links
 Oklahoma State University profile
 Photo of Milton J. Ferguson, University of Illinois Library

 

1879 births
1954 deaths
American librarians
University of Oklahoma alumni
Presidents of the American Library Association
People from Wayne County, West Virginia
Librarians from West Virginia